Birds Branch is a  long 2nd order tributary to the Ararat River in Patrick County, Virginia.

Course
Birds Branch rises on the divide of a tributary to Reed Island Creek about 1.5 miles west of the peak of Groundhog Mountain in Patrick County.  Birds Branch then flows south to join the Ararat River about 1 mile west of Ararat, Virginia.

Watershed
Birds Branch drains  of area, receives about 52.0 in/year of precipitation, has a wetness index of 326.70, and is about 62% forested.

See also
List of rivers of Virginia

References

Rivers of Virginia
Rivers of Patrick County, Virginia